The men's shot put event at the 2009 European Athletics U23 Championships was held in Kaunas, Lithuania, at S. Dariaus ir S. Girėno stadionas (Darius and Girėnas Stadium) on 16 July.

Medalists

Results

Final
16 July

Qualifications
16 July
Qualifying 18.25 or 12 best to the Final

Group A

Group B

Participation
According to an unofficial count, 19 athletes from 15 countries participated in the event.

 (1)
 (2)
 (1)
 (1)
 (1)
 (2)
 (1)
 (2)
 (1)
 (1)
 (1)
 (1)
 (2)
 (1)
 (1)

References

Shot put
Shot put at the European Athletics U23 Championships